Éditions Dupuis S.A. is a Belgian publisher of comic albums and magazines.

Based in Marcinelle near Charleroi, Dupuis was founded in 1922 by Jean Dupuis, and is mostly famous for its comic albums and magazines. Initially a French language publisher, it now publishes numerous editions in both the French language and Dutch. Other language editions are mostly licensed to other publishers. For a considerable period of time, Dupuis was a family-owned enterprise. However it was sold in the early 1980's and has since undergone multiple ownership changes.

Origin
The growth of Dupuis towards becoming the leading comic book editor of Belgium started in 1938, when Dupuis added to its portfolio a men's magazine (Le moustique [the mosquito] in French, Humoradio in Dutch), a women's magazine (Bonnes Soirées [good evenings] in French, De Haardvriend [the hearth's friend] in Dutch) and the children's comics magazine Spirou. The latter was originally only in French, and contained a mixture of American comics (e.g. Superman, Brick Bradford, and Red Ryder) and new creations (Spirou et Fantasio and Tif et Tondu). A few months later, a Dutch edition called Robbedoes followed.

Growth after WWII
After some difficulties during the war (mainly because of the scarcity of paper towards the end of it, but also because American comics weren't allowed to be published anymore), Dupuis started to grow quickly. Le moustique became one of the leading magazines with information on radio and (later) television programs in Belgium, and Spirou was one of the two leading Franco-Belgian comics magazines (together with Tintin magazine).

Dupuis started publishing some books as well, but had real success by republishing the comics that had appeared as serials in the magazine, collected as albums afterwards. Sometimes these were one shots, but mainly they came in series. Dupuis has some of the best-selling European comic series, including Lucky Luke, The Smurfs, Gaston Lagaffe and Largo Winch.  Many of these comic albums have been reprinted constantly for thirty or forty years, thereby generating constant revenue for the editor.

Stabilization and diversification
In the early sixties, Dupuis started with other activities, including the merchandising of its comic series (puppets, posters, etc.), and the making of animated movies. Most of these weren't very successful but further raised the visibility of their comics. Still, towards the end of the 1960s, the golden age of Dupuis seemed to be over. Some of the magazines were struggling, the merchandising activities were vastly reduced, and the movie studio didn't seem to be producing any successful movies. 
But the core business, the comics and the main magazines, continued to be hugely successful, with a comics catalogue of more than 2000 titles available in French. Many of the series were turned into animated movies in the 1990s, including Papyrus and Spirou et Fantasio, and are being sold as movies and comics throughout Europe. Dupuis has also started producing computer games.

In June 2004, Dupuis was bought by Média-Participations, which now owns almost all major European comic book publishers, including Dargaud and Le Lombard,  More recently, in 2015, Dupuis joined with twelve other European comics publishing actors to create Europe Comics, a digital initiative co-funded by the European Commission's Creative Europe program.

Main publications
This is a selection of magazines and comics series originally or mainly published by Dupuis. Some titles later changed to a different publisher.

Magazines
Moustique (created as "Moustique" in 1924, named "Télémoustique" between the 1960s and 2011) and its Flemish counterpart HUMO (since 1936, originally called "Humoradio")
Spirou, since 1938: between 1938 and 2005 also a Flemish version, "Robbedoes".

Comics series
Listed by year of first publication by Dupuis, with main authors given. Many series were also continued or temporarily taken over by other artists and writers.

1938: Spirou & Fantasio by Robert Velter, Jijé, André Franquin, ...
1938: Tif et Tondu by Fernand Dineur, Will, ...
1941: Jean Valhardi by Jijé
1946: Lucky Luke by Morris and René Goscinny
1947: Blondin et Cirage by Jijé
1947: Buck Danny by Victor Hubinon and Jean-Michel Charlier
1952: Johan and Peewit by Peyo
1954: Jerry Spring by Jijé
1954: La Patrouille des Castors by Mitacq and Charlier
1956: Gil Jourdan by Maurice Tillieux
1957: Gaston by André Franquin and Yvan Delporte
1958: The Smurfs by Peyo
1958: Le Vieux Nick et Barbe-Noire by Marcel Remacle
1959: Boule et Bill by Jean Roba
1960: Benoît Brisefer by Peyo
1961: Bobo by Paul Deliège and Maurice Rosy
1963: Génial Olivier by Jacques Devos
1965: Sibylline by Raymond Macherot
1965: Sophie by Jidéhem
1967: Les Petits Hommes by Pierre Seron
1968: Les Tuniques Bleues by Louis Salvérius, Lambil, and Raoul Cauvin
1969: Isabelle by Will, Franquin, Delporte and Macherot
1970: Natacha by François Walthéry and Gos
1970: Sammy by Berck and Cauvin
1970: Yoko Tsuno by Roger Leloup
1972: Scrameustache by Gos
1974: Papyrus (comics) by Lucien De Gieter
1975: Agent 212 by Daniel Kox and Cauvin
1981: Billy the Cat by Stéphane Colman and Stephen Desberg
1981: Les Femmes en Blanc by Philippe Bercovici and Cauvin
1982: Jeannette Pointu by Marc Wasterlain
1982: Kogaratsu by Michetz and Bosse
1982: Jérôme K. Jérôme Bloche by Alain Dodier
1983: Pierre Tombal by Marc Hardy and Cauvin
1983: Jojo by André Geerts
1986: Soda (comics) by Bruno Gazzotti and Tome
1987: Le Petit Spirou by Tome and Janry
1988: Cupidon by Malik and Cauvin
1989: Cédric by Laudec and Cauvin
1990: Largo Winch by Philippe Francq and Jean Van Hamme 
1992: Mélusine by Clarke and François Gilson
1993: Kid Paddle by Midam
2003: Parker and Badger by Marc Cuadrado
2004; Lady S by Philippe Aymond and Van Hamme
2005: The Bellybuttons by Maryse Dubuc and Delaf

References

External links
Homepage of Dupuis (in French)

 
Publishing companies established in 1922
Comic book publishing companies of Belgium
Belgian companies established in 1922